Rebel Charge at Chickamauga is a 1987 video game published by Strategic Simulations.

Gameplay
Rebel Charge at Chickamauga is a game in which the Battle of Chickamauga in the American Civil War is simulated in a turn-based game.

Reception
M. Evan Brooks reviewed the game for Computer Gaming World, and stated that "User-friendly, Chickamauga is an accurate rendition of the Battle of Chickamauga as it began."

Mike Siggins reviewed Rebel Charge at Chickamauga for Games International magazine, and gave it 3 stars out of 5, and stated that "Chickamauga is a good, well balanced game using an established and no doubt familiar system. If the period interests you it should be a recommended purchase, but I am left with a feeling of having to use an old style dial phone when there are push button systems on the market."

Reviews
ACE (Advanced Computer Entertainment) - Mar, 1989
Compute's Amiga Resource - Aug, 1989
Computer Gaming World - Oct, 1990

References

External links
Review in ANALOG Computing
Review in Washington Apple Pi
Review in RUN Magazine
Review in Computer Play
Review in Current Notes
Article in Atari Interface
Award from Family Computing

1987 video games
American Civil War video games
Amiga games
Apple II games
Atari 8-bit family games
Chickamauga campaign
Commodore 64 games
Computer wargames
DOS games
Strategic Simulations games
Turn-based strategy video games
Video games developed in the United States
Video games set in Georgia (U.S. state)